Bi'ina or al-Bi'na (also el-Baneh) is an Arab town in the Northern District of Israel. It is located east of Akko. In 2003, Bi'ina merged with Majd al-Krum and Deir al-Asad to form the city of Shaghur, but was reinstated as a local council in 2008 after Shaghur was dissolved.

History

Classical antiquity

Along with several other sites, Bi'ina was proposed as the location of ancient Beth-Anath mentioned in Egyptian and biblical texts. Archaeological evidence suggests that Bi'ina, though perhaps occupied in the Early Bronze Age, was no longer occupied in the Late Bronze Age. 

The old site of Bi'ina is thought to have been at the mound of Jelamet el-Bi'ina, less than a mile southeast of the present site of Bi'ina. The word jélameh, meaning "hill, mound," is sometimes employed instead of tell.

Ottoman Empire
In 1517, Bi'ina, with the rest of Palestine, was incorporated into the Ottoman Empire after it was captured from the Mamluks, and by 1596 appeared in tax registers as belonging to the Nahiya of Akka, part of   Safad Sanjak.  It had a population of 61 households; 46 Muslim  and 15 Christian. The villagers  paid a fixed tax rate of 25%  on various agricultural products, including wheat, barley, olives, cotton, goats or beehives, in addition to for  a press for grapes or olives; a total of 7,134 akçe.

A map from Napoleon's invasion of 1799 by Pierre Jacotin  showed the place, named as "El Bena", while in 1838, el Ba'neh was noted as Greek Christian village in the Esh-Shagur district, located between Safad, Acca and Tiberias.

In 1875 Victor Guérin noted that the population was divided between Druze and Greek Orthodox Christians. He listed a mosque and a Greek church, both of which were built on the sites of older churches. In the late 19th century, it was described as a village of 300 Muslims and 100 Christians, surrounded by olives and arable land. Water was supplied by a spring. A sarcophagus was also seen lying outside the town.

Lieutenant Kitchener of the Palestine Exploration Fund described the town under its name El-Baneh, and where he noted a spring and birket (reservoir).

A population list from about 1887 showed that  B'aneh had 620 inhabitants; slightly more Muslims than Greek Catholic Christians.

British Mandate
In the 1922 census of Palestine conducted by the British Mandate authorities, Al Ba'na had a population of 518; 311 Muslims and 207 Christians, where all the Christians were Orthodox. By  the 1931 census the population had increased to 651;  441 Muslims and 210 Christians, in a total of  133 houses.

In the 1945 statistics, Bi'ina  had 830 inhabitants; 530 Muslims and 300 Christians. They owned 14,839  dunams of land, while 57 dunams were public. 1,619 dunams were plantations and irrigable land, 5,543 used for cereals, while 57 dunams were built-up (urban) land.

Israel 
During Operation Hiram, 29–31 October 1948, the village surrendered to the advancing Israeli army. Many of the villagers fled north but some remained and were not expelled. The village remained under Martial Law until 1966.

In 1981, a Bedouin neighborhood was created in the village, populated by members of the Sawaed tribe from Rame. In 2001, the village was spread out over an area of some 30 dunams (7.4 acres).

Notable people

 Mohammad Bakri

Notes

References

Bibliography

 
 

 (p. 153)  

 
  
  (Deir al-Asad: p.  446, Majd al-Kurum: pp 437, 444)
 
 

  
   
  

  (p.80 -92 )

  (p. 188 no 674; p. 248 no 934; p. 256 no 974; p.  308 no 1175)

External links
Welcome To Bi'na
Survey of Western Palestine, Map 3:  IAA, Wikimedia commons

Northern District (Israel)
Arab localities in Israel
Arab Christian communities in Israel
Local councils in Northern District (Israel)